Saturday Revue was an early United States television series which aired on WCBW from 1946 to 1947. It was a variety series, broadcast at 8:00 p.m. on Saturdays. Each episode was 30 minutes in length. As methods to record live television were not available until late 1947, none of the episodes still exist.

Reception
Reviewing the first episode, Billboard magazine panned the broadcast, saying that "Belanger is a good director, and has done some fine work, as evidenced by his winning one of the TBA awards recently, but he missed the boat completely in this production. Show needs a lot of working over before viewers will stay home on Saturday nights to see what is supposed to be a good revue."

References

1946 American television series debuts
1947 American television series endings
1940s American variety television series
English-language television shows
Black-and-white American television shows
Lost television shows
American live television series
Saturday mass media